A Coo-ee from Home is a 1918 Australian silent film directed by Charles Woods about a miner who falls in love with a wealthy heiress. During filming a climactic shark attack, leading actor Bryce Rowe was attacked by a real shark and almost died.

Plot
Miner Will Morrison marries heiress Grace Norwood. Jealous Richard Myers tries to convince Will that Grace is unfaithful and when that fails he drugs Will and frames him for murder. Will is sentenced to death but a prison chaplain helps him escape. He runs away to sea, is exposed on board, jumps into the water, is attacked by a shark, but he manages to fight it off and escape. He reads that Richard has been arrested for murder back home. Will returns home and marries Grave.

Cast
Gertrude Darley as Grace Norwood
Bryce Rowe as Will Morrison
Charles Villiers
Charles Woods

Production
During filming the shark attack sequence, actor Bryce Rowe was attacked by a real shark and almost died. He had to spend two weeks in hospital.

Release
The fight between Will and the shark was heavily publicised on release.

References

External links
 
 A Coo-ee from Home at National Film and Sound Archive

Australian black-and-white films
Lost Australian films
1918 films
1918 drama films
Australian drama films
Australian silent feature films
1918 lost films
Lost drama films
Silent drama films
1910s English-language films